Eyrewell Forest is a small rural area in the Waimakariri District, New Zealand.

Etymology
During the 1920s, kānuka was replaced with plantation forestry. The name "Eyre" used for many geographic features in the wider area refers to Edward John Eyre who was Lieutenant-Governor of New Munster Province from 1848 to 1853. Eyrewell was named by an early settler, Marmaduke Dixon, when he found much-needed groundwater on his property. With about half of the area in exotic pines, the "Forest" part of the name derived.

History
Due to Canterbury's lack of native forest, in the early 1900s the government planted exotic forests throughout North Canterbury, including Eyrewell Forest. On 1 August 1975, however, most of the forest was blown over by strong north-westerly winds. The area's Pinus radiata plantation is the only place on earth where the critically endangered Eyrewell ground beetle can (or could) be found. As of January 2019, the plantation has been almost entirely cleared by local iwi Ngāi Tahu, with the intention of converting it into intensive dairy farms. Despite protests by Department of Conservation, it is thought that the rare Eyrewell ground beetle has become extinct as a result. There is also considerable concern over the large environmental impact this will have in the area, considering its proximity to the Waimakariri River and the area's dry conditions.

Demographics

Eyrewell had a population of 1,806 at the 2018 New Zealand census, an increase of 285 people (18.7%) since the 2013 census, and an increase of 888 people (96.7%) since the 2006 census. There were 627 households. There were 900 males and 906 females, giving a sex ratio of 0.99 males per female. The median age was 38.4 years (compared with 37.4 years nationally), with 399 people (22.1%) aged under 15 years, 291 (16.1%) aged 15 to 29, 966 (53.5%) aged 30 to 64, and 150 (8.3%) aged 65 or older.

Ethnicities were 90.9% European/Pākehā, 9.1% Māori, 1.3% Pacific peoples, 4.8% Asian, and 3.2% other ethnicities (totals add to more than 100% since people could identify with multiple ethnicities).

The proportion of people born overseas was 22.1%, compared with 27.1% nationally.

Although some people objected to giving their religion, 59.0% had no religion, 30.6% were Christian, 0.2% were Hindu, 0.7% were Muslim, 0.3% were Buddhist and 2.5% had other religions.

Of those at least 15 years old, 261 (18.6%) people had a bachelor or higher degree, and 210 (14.9%) people had no formal qualifications. The median income was $43,500, compared with $31,800 nationally. The employment status of those at least 15 was that 858 (61.0%) people were employed full-time, 213 (15.1%) were part-time, and 33 (2.3%) were unemployed.

Climate
The average temperature in summer is 16.2 °C, and in winter is 5.9 °C.

References

Waimakariri District
Populated places in Canterbury, New Zealand